Unión Deportiva Alzira is a Spanish football team based in Alzira, in the autonomous community of Valencia. Founded in 1946 it plays in Segunda División RFEF – Group 2, holding home games at Estadio Luis Suñer Picó, with a capacity of 5,000 seats.

History
From 1943, new local clubs started emerging in Alzira. Among them was C.D. Mercurio, the base of which served to form Unión Deportiva Alzira in 1946.

Background
 Alcira Foot-Ball Club — (1922–26)
 Agrupación Deportiva Alzira — (1931–42)
 Unión Deportiva Alzira — (1946–)

Season to season

 1 season in Segunda División
 9 seasons in Segunda División B
 2 seasons in Segunda División RFEF
 43 seasons in Tercera División
 22 seasons in Categorías Regionales''

References

External links
  
 Futbolme team profile 

Football clubs in the Valencian Community
Association football clubs established in 1946
1946 establishments in Spain
Segunda División clubs